The Flowerdale River is a river in North West Tasmania, Australia, it extends approximately  from the Campbell Ranges near West Takone before discharging into the Inglis River at Wynyard. The Flowerdale is the largest tributary system on the Inglis River and makes up approximately one-third of the  Inglis-Flowerdale catchment basin.

Inglis-Flowerdale catchment area
While not tributaries of the main river system, Sisters Creek and Seabrook Creek are notable minor creeks which form part of the  Inglis-Flowerdale catchment area.

Forestry plantations dominate the landscape in the western region of the catchment, with intensive agriculture land-use in the north and eastern regions. Because of the steep and confining nature of the topography around the Inglis and Flowerdale rivers, both have retained substantial native forests that tend to buffer the rivers from both land-use activities.

See also

References

Further reading
 Bobbi, Christopher. (et al.)  (2003)  State of rivers report for the Inglis-Flowderdale Catchment Water Assessment and Planning Branch.   Dept. of Primary Industries, Water and Environment, Hobart, Tas.

Rivers of Tasmania
Wynyard, Tasmania
Bass Strait